Paw Paw Public Schools (PPPS) is a school district headquartered in Paw Paw, Michigan.

It was established in 1870.  it has 2,300 students.

Schools
 Paw Paw High School
 Paw Paw Middle School
 Paw Paw Later Elementary School
 Paw Paw Early Elementary School
 Cedar Street Community and Family Center (preschool)
 Michigan Avenue Academy (alternative school)

Points of Pride Video Series

In the fall of the 2019-2020 school year, Paw Paw Public Schools began a popular video series to feature individuals connected to the school district. Called Points of Pride stories, or POP Stories, each video is 3–5 minutes in length and features a student, staff member, or community member talking about his/her connection to Paw Paw schools. The videos are published on the District Facebook page, and several videos have been viewed 8,000 times or more.

Threat
Schools across Paw Paw were closed on Monday, March 19, 2018 due to a threat. The threat was reportedly given by a 15-year-old student Aiden Ingalls at the High School, who was arrested after police searched the student's house. All of the schools opened the following day.

Nickname 

On March 9, 2020, Paw Paw Public Schools Board of Education trustees voted to retire the Redskin nickname at the end of 2019-2020 school year. A 27-student task force worked to gather input from students, alumni, and the Paw Paw community, and after a several-month search, announced the new nickname for the school would be the Paw Paw Red Wolves at the July, 2020 meeting of the Board of Education. Paw Paw Athletes, Coaches React to New Red Wolves nickname. The school district will begins the 2020-21 school year as the Paw Paw Red Wolves, the only school with the Red Wolves nickname and logo in the State of Michigan.
Paw Paw School District Officially Changes Nickname to 'Red Wolves'; Introduces Logo

On January 21, 2019, the American Civil Liberties Union of Michigan filed a federal discrimination complaint alleging a racially hostile environment in the Paw Paw Public Schools District. The ACLU reported that it "used the Freedom of Information Act to obtain a substantial number of school district records that betray the widespread racially toxic climate in the schools." In 2017, the district witnessed a controversy involving the removal of "Redskins" as the school mascot name, with the school board of education voting 4-3 to keep the name.

References

External links
 Paw Paw Public Schools
 Map of buildings

School districts in Michigan
1870 establishments in Michigan
Education in Van Buren County, Michigan
School districts established in 1870